Giancarlo Caltabiano (born April 6, 1976) is a Canadian actor best known as George S. Goodwin III on Radio Active and Ben Shaw on Fries with That?.

Filmography

References

External links

1976 births
Living people
Canadian people of Italian descent
Canadian male film actors
Canadian male television actors